The Girl and the Oak is a 1955 Yugoslav film directed by Krešo Golik.

References

External links

1955 films
Jadran Film films
Films directed by Krešo Golik
Croatian drama films
1955 drama films
Yugoslav drama films
Films set in Yugoslavia
Films set in Croatia
Yugoslav black-and-white films
Serbo-Croatian-language films